Gakowzheh-ye Olya (also Romanized as Gākowzheh-ye ‘Olyā; also known as Kākowzheh-ye ‘Olyā) is a village in Melkari Rural District, Vazineh District, Sardasht County, West Azerbaijan Province, Iran. At the 2006 census, its population was 21, in 5 families.

References 

Populated places in Sardasht County